American actor Jesse Eisenberg has received numerous accolades and nominations throughout his acting career. He is best known for playing Facebook founder Mark Zuckerberg in The Social Network (2010), for which he received BAFTA Award, Golden Globe, and Academy Award nominations in the Best Actor category.

Major associations

Academy Awards

British Academy Film Awards

Golden Globe Awards

Screen Actors Guild Awards

Film critics awards

Broadcast Film Critics Association

Chicago Film Critics Association

Dallas–Fort Worth Film Critics Association

IndieWire Critics Poll

London Film Critics' Circle

National Society of Film Critics

Online Film Critics Society

San Diego Film Critics Society

St. Louis Film Critics Association

Toronto Film Critics Association

Vancouver Film Critics Circle

Village Voice Film poll

Washington D.C. Area Film Critics Association

Film festival awards

Abu Dhabi Film Festival

Big Apple Film Festival

Film Club's The Lost Weekend

Palm Springs International Film Festival

San Diego Film Festival

Sarajevo Film Festival

Vail Film Festival

Film industry awards

Alliance of Women Film Journalists

Awards Circuit Community

Capri, Hollywood

CinemaCon, USA

Fangoria Chainsaw Awards

Gold Derby Awards 
Eisenberg has received three nominations.

Golden Raspberry Awards

Gotham Awards

Hollywood Film Awards

IGN Summer Movie Awards

Independent Spirit Awards

Indiana Film Journalists Association, US

International Cinephile Society Awards

Irish Film and Television Awards

National Board of Review, USA

Satellite Awards

Young Artist Awards

Audience awards

Italian Online Movie Awards

MTV Movie Awards

National Movie Awards, UK

Teen Choice Awards

References

External links 
 

Eisenberg, Jesse